Appignano del Tronto is a comune (municipality) in the Province of Ascoli Piceno in the Italian region Marche, located about  south of Ancona and about  northeast of Ascoli Piceno.

Appignano del Tronto borders the following municipalities: Ascoli Piceno, Castel di Lama, Castignano, Offida.

References

Cities and towns in the Marche
Articles which contain graphical timelines